Rubén Elías Guevara (born 27 January 1964 in Panama City, Panama) is a retired football midfielder.

Club career
Nicknamed Tátara, Guevara started his career at Plaza Amador, but made his senior debut for Unión San Miguelito. He then played abroad for Salvadoran side  Cojutepeque, alongside compatriots René Mendieta, José Alfredo Poyatos and Percival Piggott and had a lengthy spell with Tauro. He also played in Peru for León de Huánuco. 

He finished his career with San Francisco in 2001.

International career
Guevara made his debut for Panama in 1984 and has earned over 20 caps, scoring at least 2 goals. He represented his country in 11 FIFA World Cup qualification matches and played at the 1991 UNCAF Nations Cup.

His final international was a December 1996 FIFA World Cup qualification match against Cuba.

International goals
Scores and results list Panama's goal tally first.

Managerial career
He started his senior coaching career when he was named caretaker at Tauro in October 2006. In March 2007, Tátara was named manager of San Francisco and again in March 2009, after spending time in the Alianza hot seat.

Guevara was appointed manager of Plaza Amador in summer 2010. He took charge at Río Abajo in 2011 and returned at the helm in summer 2014, after a season at fellow second division side Millenium UP.

References

External links
 

1964 births
Living people
Sportspeople from Panama City
Association football midfielders
Panamanian footballers
Panama international footballers
Tauro F.C. players
León de Huánuco footballers
San Francisco F.C. players
Panamanian expatriate footballers
Expatriate footballers in El Salvador
Expatriate footballers in Peru
Panamanian football managers
Tauro F.C. managers
San Francisco F.C. managers